Štefan Harvan (17 May 1937 – 9 January 2007) was a Slovak cross-country skier. He competed in the men's 30 kilometre event at the 1964 Winter Olympics.

References

External links
 

1937 births
2007 deaths
Slovak male cross-country skiers
Olympic cross-country skiers of Czechoslovakia
Cross-country skiers at the 1964 Winter Olympics
Universiade medalists in cross-country skiing
Universiade silver medalists for Czechoslovakia
Competitors at the 1960 Winter Universiade
Competitors at the 1962 Winter Universiade
Competitors at the 1964 Winter Universiade
People from Poprad District
Sportspeople from the Prešov Region